In Russian folklore, Chernava (diminutive: Chernavushka) is Morskoy Tsar's (Sea Tsar) daughter (or, according to some versions, a niece), spirit and personification of the river of the same name. She is a mermaid. Her head and upper body are human, while the lower body is a fish's tail. Chernava is famous from the epic of Sadko, where she appears.

In Sadko
In the Sadko bylina, Chernava appears as the one of the 900 mermaids. She is described as small, scrawny and young girl who works as a servant in the palace. When Morskoy Tsar offered Sadko a new bride,  Sadko took Chernava and lay down beside her. On their wedding night he did not touch her. When Sadko was asleep, Chernava had transformed into a river, helping him to get into the human world. Sadko woke up on the shore of the river Chernava and rejoined his first wife.

In popular culture
Chernava Colles are named after her.

References

Bibliography

External links
 Краткое содержание и история создания оперы Римского-Корсакова «Садко» на сайте «Belcanto.Ru» (in Russian) 
 Bylina «Садков корабль стал на море» (in Russian) 
 Bylina «Садко» (in Russian) 
 Sadko the bylina
 Prose version
 Sadko as collected by Arthur Ransome in Old Peter's Russian Tales
 Sadko as collected by Arthur Ransome in Old Peter's Russian Tales as a librivox.org audiobook.

Characters in Bylina
Russian folklore

Russian folklore characters
Slavic paganism
Mermaids
Slavic folklore characters